Unionville Square Historic District is a national historic district located at Unionville, Putnam County, Missouri.  The district encompasses 61 contributing buildings and 1 contributing structure in the central business district of Unionville.  It developed between about 1872 and 1951, and includes representative examples of Italianate and Colonial Revival style architecture. Notable buildings include the Putnam County Courthouse (1923-1924), O. J. Townsend Block (1889-1890), United States Farm Service Agency (1951), United States Soil Conservation Service (1951), Putnam County Library (1951), Putnam County Historical Museum (1912–13, 1928), United States Post Office (1930-1931), Unionville City Hall (1894-1897), and the Putnam County Senior Center (1892).

It was listed on the National Register of Historic Places in 2002.

References

Historic districts on the National Register of Historic Places in Missouri
Italianate architecture in Missouri
Colonial Revival architecture in Missouri
Buildings and structures in Putnam County, Missouri
National Register of Historic Places in Putnam County, Missouri